Poshtove may refer to the following places in Ukraine:

Poshtove, Crimea
Poshtove, Zhytomyr Oblast